Donga Ramudu is a 1955 Indian Telugu-language drama film co-written and directed by K. V. Reddy. It stars Akkineni Nageswara Rao, Savitri, Jamuna, and Jaggayya with music composed by Pendyala. The film was produced by D. Madhusudhana Rao under the Annapurna Pictures banner.

Donga Ramudu is the debut production of Annapurna Pictures. Released on October 1, 1955, the film became a super hit. Donga Ramudu established Annapurna Pictures as a top banner. The film was archived in the curriculum of the Film and Television Institute of India. Donga Ramudu was dubbed in Tamil as Thiruttu Raman (1956) and was commercially successful. It was later remade in Hindi as Man-Mauji (1962) and again in Tamil as Vasanthi (1988).

Plot 
A young boy Ramudu frequently gets into trouble with his mischievous behavior. He dotes upon his sister Lakshmi. One day when his destitute mother Subbamma is ailing and needs expensive medications, he steals the medicine and lands at a reformatory. After the death of Subbamma (Hemalatha), Lakshmi is sent to an orphanage.

Years later, a grown-up Ramudu (Akkineni Nageswara Rao) is released and goes in search of his sister. He rescues a child, the son of a rich miser Veerabhadrayya (Relangi) from a local thug Babulu (R. Nageswara Rao) and gets the job of a servant in his house. Here, Ramudu gets acquainted with a vegetable vendor Seeta (Savitri) and they fall in love. After some time, he learns the whereabouts of Lakshmi (Jamuna). He pretends to be a wealthy businessman and promises to pay her college fees. To raise the amount, he tries to rob Veerabhadrayya but is caught and sentenced.

Lakshmi is ashamed of her brother and leaves the orphanage. She falls into the clutches of Babulu but Seeta rescues her. Lakshmi is hospitalized where she meets a benevolent doctor Mohan (Jaggayya) who helps the poor. Lakshmi finds shelter in his house. Impressed by her good nature, Mohan decides to marry her. After serving his sentence, Ramudu meets Seeta who is angry with him but forgives him after he explains his predicament. By chance, Ramudu is hired as a driver at Mohan's house where he encounters Lakshmi. He is very pleased with her marriage and warns her not to let anyone know that he is her brother. Fearing that his past might jeopardize her happiness, he decides to leave. Ramudu is charged with theft at Mohan's home. As a result, he is insulted and kicked out. Lakshmi remains silent due to the promise.

Veerabhadrayya is displeased about Mohan's marriage to Lakshmi as he had wished to get his daughter married to Mohan. When he recognizes Lakshmi as Ramudu's sister, he decides to reveal her identity. Learning of his plan, Ramudu threatens him and silently attends his sister's wedding. Taking advantage of the situation, Babulu robs and murders Veerabhadrayya. Ramudu is indicted for the crime. Lakshmi comes forward, to tell the truth, that Ramudu is her brother and was present at the wedding during the time of the murder. Meanwhile, Seeta brings forward evidence that Babulu is the real murderer. The movie ends on a happy note with the marriage of Ramudu and Seeta.

Cast 
 Akkineni Nageswara Rao as Ramudu
 Savitri as Seeta
 Jamuna as Lakshmi
 Jaggayya as Dr. Mohan
 Relangi as Veerabhadrayya
 Suryakantham
 R. Nageswara Rao as Babulu
 Allu Ramalingaiah
 Vangara as School teacher
 Mikkilineni
 Dr. Sivaramakrishnayya
 Hemalatha as Subbamma
 Vinnakota Ramanna Panthulu
 Padmanabham as Driver
 Chalam
 Balakrishna as Cook
 Kuchala Kumari as Dancer (Song Levoyi Chinnavada)

Production 
After Akkineni Nageswara Rao became a major movie star, his friend and mentor, Dukkipati Madhusudana Rao felt it was the right time to launch their own production company. They established Annapurna Pictures (P) Ltd, named after Madhusudana Rao’s stepmother. Besides Madhusudana Rao and Nageswara Rao, the company had other partners. P. S. Ramakrishna Rao and P. Pullayya who gave memorable hits with Nageswara Rao were approached to direct Annapurna's debut venture but could not commit due to various reasons. Nageswara Rao had a wish to work with K. V. Reddy and when they met him, K. V. Reddy obliged on condition that they have to wait till he completed Pedda Manushulu (1954).

D. V. Narasaraju, the writer of Pedda Manushulu was chosen to pen the story and dialogues. Since he was directing Nageswara Rao for the first time, K. V. Reddy thought it should be different from the actor's earlier films. He suggested that he pen a story on a brother-sister sentiment with the brother going to any extent, even giving up his life for the sake of his sister. Madhusudana Rao recollected a short story, Loving Brothers that he had read in an anthology of American short stories. In the story, the elder brother commits robberies to educate his younger brother. Taking that point replacing the younger brother with a sister, Narasaraju, Madhusudana Rao and K. V. Reddy wrote the story of Donga Ramudu.

Akkineni Nageswara Rao and R. Nageswara Rao took special coaching from stunt director Raghavulu for the wrestling scene in the film. K. V. Reddy’s children were featured in the song "Bhale Thatha Mana Bapuji".

Soundtrack 

Music was composed by Pendyala. Lyrics were written by Samudrala Sr in a month.

Tamil songs
Lyrics were by Kanaga Surabhi and Kannadasan. All the tunes for all the songs and singers for both languages are the same.

Release and Reception 
The film released on October 1, 1955 and became a super hit. Donga Ramudu was dubbed in Tamil as Thiruttu Raman (1956).

Legacy 
Donga Ramudu established Annapurna Pictures as a top banner in Telugu cinema. It was later remade in Hindi as Man-Mauji (1962) and again in Tamil as Vasanthi (1988).

Narasaraju created catchy words such as ‘gas’ for telling a lie which remains popular to this day. R. Nageswara Rao’s famous dialogue, Babulu gaadi debba ante Golconda abba anali, also became popular. The film was archived in the curriculum of the Film and Television Institute of India for its excellence in filmmaking.

References

External links 
 

1950s Telugu-language films
1955 drama films
1955 films
Films directed by K. V. Reddy
Films scored by Pendyala Nageswara Rao
Indian black-and-white films
Indian drama films
Telugu films remade in other languages